Pubert is a French company based in Chantonnay, a town of the Western French region of Vendée. The company is the leading manufacturer of tillers in the world.

History
The Pubert Company was founded in Chantonnay, France in 1840. Its headquarters and main production site are still there today. The company has been run by the Pubert family for six generations.

Pubert’s founders invented the reversible plow during the first half of the nineteenth century. During the 1960s, Pubert started working on mechanized agricultural tools and released its first motor-powered tiller in 1976.

The current CEO, Jean-Pierre Pubert has been head of the company since 1984. In 1984, Pubert was one of the smallest manufacturers in France. In the year 2000, the company became the largest European manufacturer and in 2005, the worldleading manufacturer of tillers.

Products
Pubert manufactures :

 tillers (world leading manufacturer)
 brushcutters
 lawn scarifiers
 dethatcher (accessory to be mounted on tiller)
 weed whacker (accessory to be mounted on tiller)
 plows (accessory to be mounted on tiller)
 furrowing plow (accessory to be mounted on tiller)

Pubert is a supplier for Honda, Husqvarna and Staub.

In 1987, to prove the quality of its tillers, Pubert set a Guinness World Record by running one of its tillers for 24 hours non-stop.

Figures
Revenue (or turnover) : €70 million (in 2008)

Exports: 70% of sales

Production: 200 000 tillers per year – which represents 25-30% of worldwide production.

Production sites :

 Chantonnay, France
 Lons-le-Saunier, France
 Jionan, China (since 2008)

Staff : 200 employees

Internationalization: products sold in 40 countries / 5 continents

Awards
In 2009, Jean-Pierre Pubert (CEO) was elected Western-French entrepreneur of the year.

In 2000, Pubert’s products won the Safety Award at the URBAVERT-URBATEC convention in France.

Key executives
Jean-Pierre Pubert CEO since 1984

Didier Grare : Directing Manager

Sources
Site Officiel
EcoMag Tele-Vendée 2009

Companies based in Pays de la Loire
Manufacturing companies of France